Anejom̃ or Aneityum (also spelled  Anejom, and formerly Aneiteum, Aneityumese) is an Oceanic language spoken by 900 people on Aneityum Island, Vanuatu.  It is the only indigenous language of Aneityum.

Classification 
Anejom̃ is part of the Austronesian language family, and is part of the large subgroup of Oceanic languages.  Anejom̃ falls under the Southern Oceanic Languages subgroup, and more specifically Southern Vanuatuan Languages.  It constitutes its own separate branch of Southern Vanuatuan languages.  While Anejom̃ is now considered to be only one language, some historical reports have suggested that Anejom̃ might have consisted of two very distinct dialects.  Its closest relatives are preliminarily thought to be more closely related to the languages of Tanna (e.g. Kwamera, South-West Tanna, Lenakel) than Erromango languages.

Geography 

The island of Aneityum is the southernmost inhabited island of the nation of Vanuatu.  It is closest to the islands of Tanna and Futuna.  The island's geographic location made Anejom̃ develop in isolation.  The first speakers of the language are believed to have lived on hillsides near coasts in order to access resources.  However, due to land degradation and population pressure, the speakers moved to the valleys.

History 
Aneityum is thought to have been settled around 874 BCE +/- 60 years by people coming over from Tanna.  Original settlers (and speakers of the language) are thought to have lived on hillsides near the coasts in order to access resources from the ocean and land.  However, the combination of land degradation and population forced the Aneityumese to move onto valley flats instead.

The original political system was like much of Melanesia; it was composed of multiple chiefs (natimarid) ruling over many chiefdoms (neclau).  According to oral tradition, the island had two chiefdoms but they split to then form seven chiefdoms each "further divided into a number of districts between fifty and sixty in number".

The first contact with Europeans was in 1830, when the brig Alpha landed in Aneityum with hopes of establishing a sandalwood trading business.

The population of the Aneityumese has greatly declined over the years (along with the number of speakers); however, the population has seen a bit of a resurgence in the present.  Most of the population was decimated by two major epidemics in the 1830s and 1840s and never fully recovered as can be seen below:

Church Presence 
Like much of the rest of Melanesia, the church has played an important role in language ideology on Aneityum.  The first missionaries to land on the island were Samoan Presbyterians who arrived in 1841.  After them followed European Presbyterian missionaries who established themselves in 1848.  With the large missionary presence on the island, many schools were founded to spread the message of Christianity.  In these schools, the classroom was mainly conducted in Anejom̃, however numeracy was conducted in English.  The missionary presence on the island was so prevalent that the island was considered the "first successfully missionized island in Melanesia" and housed the headquarters of the Presbyterian Mission to the New Hebrides.

The missions on Aneityum promoted the use of English.

Colonialization 
Vanuatu came under joint British and French rule in 1887, which then became formalized in 1906 where Vanuatu became known as the "Anglo-French Condominium".  Colonialization along with the big mission presence on the island led to the languages of French and English to become prestige languages.  Other languages of Vanuatu also became prestigious (such as Nguna) because these language were chosen by missionaries to spread their teachings.  With prolonged contact with English speakers, another language also arose: Bislama.  Bislama, a pidgin of English, is now an extremely widely used language and has had a huge role in language change within Anejom̃.

Phonology and Orthography

Phonemes 
Anejom̃ has 5 vowels and 20 or 21 consonants. The sound [ʔ] is sometimes counted as phoneme.

Vowel and consonant length is contrastive in this language and is shown in orthography by writing the vowel or consonant twice.

Orthography 
Anejom̃ was never a written language and so traditionally did not have an orthography.  The first orthography was made by the missionary John Inglis in 1882.  It was considered to be a fairly good orthography of its time (having a one-to-one correspondence between letters and phonemes), however it did contain several key problems.  
 It did not distinguish between /pʷ/ and /p/ and /mʷ/ and /m/.
 The phoneme /ɲ/ was not always written as a separate letter from other nasal phonemes.
 The allophone of /e/, [ə], was written confusingly as "eu".
 Palatal off-glide before a palatal consonant was denoted as an "i".
 Vowel and consonant length were not represented consistently in the orthography.
A new orthography more accepted by Anejom̃ speakers now is shown below.

Allophones

Glottal Stop 
The moderately phonemic glottal stop is an allophone of /h/ when it occurs before a consonant.  It also occurs as an allophone before vowels that occur in the word initial position.

Nasals 
The phoneme /ɲ/ becomes [j̃] after a high vowel.

Voicing 
Stops and affricates in Anejom̃ change in voicing depending where they occur between segments as described and illustrated below.
 Between vowels labial stops become voiced.  Other stops (and affricates) are partially voiced.  
 Between voiced segments all stops are variably voiced.  The affricate /tʃ/ is variably voiced between voiced segments too.  However, when it occurs before a nasal segment it becomes [c].
 When these stops occur word initially, they are always slightly aspirated.  The affricate /tʃ/ on the other hand is not aspirated but often takes on variable voicing.
 When these stops and affricates don't occur between vowels or voiced segments they stay as their underlying form.  For example, /p/ becomes [p] and /k/ becomes [k].
 When these stops occur in final position, the phonemes don't change. However, the affricate /tʃ/ becomes [c], but can also be heard as [tʃ] in free variation.

Liquids 
 /ɾ/ can be heard as [r] in slower speech.

Vowels 
 Vowel sounds are more tense when occurring as a long vowel.
 Single vowel sounds /ɪ ʊ/ occur tense [i u] in word-final position.
 /e o/ occur as [e̝ o̝] when preceding a high vowel /i u/ of the same frontness or roundness.
 /i e/ occur as centralized [ɨ ə] before and after /ɣ/.
 /a/ very often assimilates before a following high vowel, becoming [æ] or [ɛ] before /i/, and [ɒ] or [ɔ] before /u/.

Morphology

Pronouns
There are three types of pronouns in Anejom̃: personal, demonstrative and interrogative pronouns.

Personal Pronouns 
Anejom̃ "personal pronouns distinguish:
 three persons, with a further distinction of inclusive and exclusive in first person non-singular
 four numbers (singular, dual, trial and plural)
 three cases (focal, object and possessive)"

Focal Pronouns 

*The focal pronouns aek and aen are only used in writing or when a speaker speaks slowly.  Most of the time the pronouns aak and aan, respectively, are used instead (and are generally pronounced with short vowels instead of long vowels).  Below is an example of a focal pronoun.

Object Pronouns 

Object pronouns are free morphemes and occur after verbs and certain "case-marking prepositions" as seen below. 

**The 2SG and 3SG object pronouns normally occur as yic and yin, however when a vowel precedes these pronouns then they change to the suffixes -c and -n respectively.

Possessive Pronouns 

Possessive pronouns occur as suffixes and can be attached to "directly possessed nouns and possessive markers, some case-markers, and to members of one sub-class of verbs". See below.

Interrogative Pronouns
There are two interrogative pronouns in Anejom̃: di ('who') and panid and its less widely used alternate, panida ('which').

However, 'di is "inherently singular" and requires a coordinate phrase with im, as seen in the example here, to express plurality.

Panid and Panida can only be used to refer to inanimate objects.

Demonstrative Pronouns
Demonstrative Pronouns also have singular, dual, trial and plural forms like personal pronouns (see below).

In Anejom̃, demonstrative pronouns can also take the suffix -sak which denotes that the speaker is "pointing at or in some other way indicating the location of the thing referred to."

 Nouns 
Anejom̃ has several categories for nouns: temporal, locative, personal, obligatorily possessed and optionally possessed nouns.  The latter two categories (obligatorily possessed and optionally possessed nouns), are further distinguished based on animacy (as seen below).   

 Temporal Nouns 
Examples of common temporal nouns can be seen below.

 Locative Nouns 
Locative nouns in Anejom̃ do not need the case marker "a" to occur in front of it as shown in the example below.

Locative nouns also include the following words:

 Personal Nouns 
Personal Nouns include kinship terms as well as names of people.

 Obligatorily Possessed Nouns 
These nouns must "be marked as being possessed by some other noun or pronoun", which tends to be marked by suffixation.  Most of the obligatorily possessed nouns are kinship terms.

An example of direct suffixation can be seen in the examples below.

There are some nouns that do not take direct suffixation but rather use possessive markers such as the word for "child", "nephew", "niece", and "sister," to name a few.

 Optionally Possessed Nouns 
Unlike obligatorily possessed nouns, these nouns do not, or do not have to, take possession markers.

 Animate and Inanimate Nouns 
Anejom̃ has a distinction between animate and inanimate nouns which is further divided into obligatorily possessed and optionally possessed nouns.

Animate nouns are usually marked by using the subject marker "a" for singular and the prefix "elpu-" for plural.

Pluralization of the word meaning 'man' to 'men' seen below.

natam̃añ → elpu-atam̃añ

Inanimate nouns are not marked in either the singular or plural.

 Noun Prefixes 
Anejom̃ has several key prefixes that serve important roles:

*Inta- is used sparingly compared to the other prefixes.  Most of the time, instrumental nouns are compounds that include the word 'nitai', which is most likely where 'inta comes from.

 N-/in- Prefix 
The n-/in- prefix is a frequently used as well as frequently occurring underlying morpheme: it accounts for around 85% of Anejom̃ nouns.  The other approximate 15% of nouns that don't use this prefix tend to be highly specific groups of nouns.

 Collective Prefixes 
Anejom̃ also has a different set of prefixes that are referred to as collective prefixes as they refer to large groups of things:

 Noun Suffixes 

 Direct Possession 
In Anejom̃, the possessive form of personal pronouns are attached directly to the noun when "the possessor is a personal pronoun".

 Indirect Possession 
For all other nouns that cannot be directly possessed, a "possessive or construct suffix is added to a possessive marker" as seen below. 

 Verbs 
Verbs in Anejom̃ are words that can occur as the head of a verb phrase.  In Anejom̃, verbs are distinguished by transitivity; there are transitive, intransitive and (the family small class of) ambi-transitive verbs.  Examples of these verbs can be seen below.

*Many transitive verbs also have intransitive pairings as can be seen by the two verbs that mean 'to eat' in the table above.

 The Verbs 'yek' and 'isp̃a ====
Both of these verbs are unusual in that they do not follow the regular pattern.

===== Yek': to be at, be present =
'Yek is an existential verb that is different from the majority of Anejom̃ verbs in a number of ways.
 The root of 'yek''' changes irregularly in the singular, dual and trial forms.
 The verb does not take subject-tense markers, though it does take certain aspect-mood markers.
 Pronoun subjects come after 'yek
 Noun phrases normally come before 'yek instead of after and don't take the subject marker 'a'. It has specific markers it can and cannot occur with.

 Isp̃a 
This verb marks the reflexive or reciprocal and takes an agreeing possessive suffix as seen below.

 Inflectional Prefixes 

 The vowel (i) is only added if it occurs before a consonant.

 Reduplication 
Anejom̃ does have reduplication although it is not used very often.  It most commonly occurs as complete reduplication as seen below.

 Object Suffixes for Transitive Verbs 
Not including the verbs which take possessive suffixes, there are three main types of ways in which transitive verbs are marked.  The types of verbs are: 1) unmarked verbs, 2) "verbs that take the transitive suffix "-i" with all objects", 3) verbs that only take "-i" with animate objects and "-ñ" with inanimate objects.

 Directional and Locational Verb Suffixes 
These suffixes attach to the end of the verb and will come after a transitive suffix if one occurs. 

Distance suffixes have to combine with horizontal or vertical suffixes; they cannot be alone.  The ordering of these suffixes are as follows: 1) VERTICAL, 2) HORIZONTAL, 3) DISTANCE.

 Subject-Tense Marking 
In a verb phrase, a subject marking morpheme tends to occur first (except if it is an imperative, optionally conjoined, or subordinate clause).  In Anejom̃, subject-tense-aspect marking is undergoing radical change.

There seems to be a lot of change in present day subject-tense marking, especially in the plural subject-tense marking category by younger speakers.  Here are all the (competing) subject-tense markers used in modern Anejom̃.

 Mood, Aspect, Tense Markers 
Anejom̃ has several markers (different than the subject-markers) which indicate a variety of mood, aspect and tense.

 Compounding 
Compounding is a key historical and modern feature of Anejom̃; it has both compound nouns and compound verbs.  Compound nouns generally consist of a noun followed by either a noun, verb, modifier or a possessive construction, and compound verbs tend to be a combination of two verbs, although sometimes a verb is followed by a noun.  Compounding is so prevalent, that historical linguistics use modern (as well as fossilized compounds) to trace genealogical relationships between Oceanic languages.  Another one of the key uses of compounding in Anejom̃, is it is used to form the instrumental case. Examples of compounding can be seen below.

 Syntax 
Anejom̃ word order is fairly strict and does not allow for much variation.  The preferred word order in Anejom̃ is VOS (or verb, followed by object, then subject).  This word order is extremely unusual within the languages of Vanuatu and makes Anejom̃ the "only non-Polynesian language in Vanuatu to have this preferred word order."  Below are a couple of examples of intransitive and transitive sentences.

 Departures from VOS 
While Anejom̃ has a fairly strict word order, there are times that the language departs from the standard VOS order.
 Although not very common, subjects and objects are moved to the beginning of the phrase when topicalized.
 When an object is a fairly long word, it is switched with the subject making the order VSO instead.
 Indefinite subjects tend to come before verbs, making the order SVO.
 With the verb 'yek, pronoun subjects follow the verb but noun phrases come before it.

 Cases 
Anejom̃ has multiple cases that are denoted by several different case markers summed up below.

 Indicating Time and Place 
Temporal phrases can be marked with or without a case depending on the phrase.

 Unmarked Phrases 
Unmarked temporal phrases take a temporal noun and unmarked locative phrases take either a locative noun or a locative demonstrative.  There are two types of local demonstratives: the first type is the one seen in the table below and the second is formed adding locative suffixes (see table earlier on page) to the root au'.Locative Demonstratives that are formed by adding the locative suffixes to the root au- must follow a specific order:au- VERTICAL - DISTANCEau- HORIZONTAL - DISTANCEau - VERTICAL - HORIZONTAL - DISTANCE

 Marked Phrases 
Marked temporal phrases and place phrases (that don't have a non-personal noun at the head), take the case marker 'a'. For non-personal place phrases, the case marker 'u' is used instead.  When a place phrase uses a personal noun or pronoun, ehele- is used instead of either 'a' or 'u.

 Questions 
There are two types of questions: yes/no and content questions.

 Yes/No Questions 
Yes/no questions can be asked in two ways.  One way to indicate a question is by ending a phrase on a raised intonation.  The second way is to add the word 'ka a'o' (which means or no') to the end of a sentence.

 Content Questions 
Unlike yes/no questions, content questions use interrogative morphemes such as:

 'who': di what': inhe 'which/which one': panid/panida 'when': nuhup̃an 'which/which thing': nev(e)- 'where': eda (acts like a locative noun)
 'how to': ehv(e)- (verbal prefix)

 Combining Clauses 
There are several different ways to combine clauses together:
 "simple clause chaining"
 conjunctions
 using am̃ and p̃ar the "echo-subject proclitic m- verb serialization

 Simple Clause Chaining 
In simple clause chaining, no conjunctions are markings are used to link two separate clauses together.  Simple clause chaining can be used either for clauses of the same or different subject and for both verbal and verbless clauses.

 Conjunctions 
There are three conjunctions that combine clauses in Anejom̃: 'ka', 'jai', and 'jam which are the equivalents of 'or', 'but' and 'but' respectively.

'Ka'

'Jai' and 'Jam' have the same meaning, however 'jai' is used when the subjects of the two combining clauses are different and 'jam' is used when the two combining subjects are the same.  Jai' is also used when a subject-tense marker occurs at the beginning of the clause following it, regardless of the subject.

'Jai'

'Jam'

 Am̃ and p̃ar Am̃ and p̃ar are also conjunctions that respectively mean 'and' and 'and then, so'.  However, they don't function like normal conjunctions but rather aspect markers as seen below.

 M- M- is attached "to the first word in the verb phrase of a non-initial clause which has the same subject as the preceding clause".  It can also denote continuous aspect.

 Verb Serialization 
While verb serialization does not occur much in Anejom̃ in comparison to other Western Oceanic Languages, it occurs more commonly than in its closest related languages. Most of the verb-serializations in Anejom̃ contain directional motion verbs in the non-initial clause as seen below:

 Relative Clauses 
Relative clauses in Anejom̃ do not have relative pronouns and they directly follow the noun phrase that it is modifying.  For example:

 Sample Texts 
 http://paradisec.org.au/fieldnotes/image_viewer.htm?ANEIT309,3

Lynch, John and Philip Tepahae (2001). Anejom̃ dictionary. Canberra: Pacific Linguistics

Notes
 from John Lynch’s Grammar of Anejom̃:

 from other sources

References

	

 Capell, Arthur. John 13:7 in the languages Futuna; Aneityum; Tanna-Lenakel; Tanna- Kwamera; Tanna Eastern (White Sands); Efate-Erakor; Nguna. PARADISEC. n.d. http://paradisec.org.au/fieldnotes/image_viewer.htm?COMVO202,1.Accessed 20 March. 2016.
 Capell, Arthur. A Re-Study of the Language of Aneityum New Hebrides. After 1960. http://paradisec.org.au/fieldnotes/image_viewer.htm?ANEIT302,4,1,L,80. Accessed 20 March. 2016.
 Capell, Arthur. Two Stories in Aneityumese. PARADISEC.
 n.d. http://paradisec.org.au/fieldnotes/image_viewer.htm?ANEIT309,3,1,L,80. Accessed 20 March. 2016.
 Lynch, John, and Matthew Spriggs. “Anejom̃ Numerals: The (Mis)Adventures Of A Counting System.” Te Reo 38. (1995): 37–52. Communication & Mass Media Complete. Accessed 27.  Mar. 2016.
 Lynch, John. A Century of Linguistic Change in Anejom. In Robert A. Blust, ed., Currents in Pacific linguistics: Papers on Austronesian linguistics and ethnolinguistics in honour of George W. Grace, 185–195. PL, C-117.
 Lynch, John Dominic. Church, State and Language in Melanesia: An Inaugural Lecture. Papua New Guinea: U of Papua New Guinea, 1979.
 Lynch John. “Grammatical Change in Progress: The Anejom Conditionals.” Australian Journal of Linguistics 20.2 (2000): Communication & Mass Media Complete. Accessed 27 Mar. 2016.
 Lynch, John, and Terry Crowley. Languages of Vanuatu: A New Survey and Bibliography. Canberra: Pacific Linguistics, Research School of Pacific and Asian Studies, The Australian National University, 2001.
 Lynch, John. The Linguistic History of Southern Vanuatu. Canberra: Pacific Linguistics, Research School of Pacific and Asian Studies, The Australian National University, 2001. PHOIBLE. 2014. Aneityum sound inventory (PH). In: Moran, Steven & McCloy, Daniel & Wright, Richard (eds.) PHOIBLE Online. Leipzig: Max Planck Institute for Evolutionary Anthropology. (Available online at http://phoible.org/inventories/view/1228, Accessed on 2016-03-15.)
 Tryon, Darrell T. New Hebrides Languages: an internal classification''. Canberra: Department of Linguistics, Research School of Pacific Studies, Australian National University, 1976. 541–545.

External links
Anejom̃ on Austronesian Database
PARADISEC archive of the Anejom Dictionary
Database of audio recordings in Aneityum - basic Catholic prayers

Languages of Vanuatu
South Vanuatu languages
Verb–object–subject languages